Naseeruddin Mauzi Nagar was an Indian Khilafat Movement activist. He was one of three Khilafat Movement activists hanged by the colonial authorities for the killing of Sir Robert William Douglas Willoughby, Deputy Commissioner of Kheri, on 26 August 1920.

The East India Company built Willoughby Memorial Hall in 1924 in memory of Robert William Douglas Willoughby. On 26 April 1936, Willoughby Memorial Library was established. The Willoughby Memorial Hall was recently renamed the Naseeruddin Memorial Hall.

References 

People from Lakhimpur Kheri
Revolutionary movement for Indian independence
Indian revolutionaries
Executed revolutionaries
Indian Muslims
Executed Indian people
People executed by British India by hanging
People executed for murdering police officers